Dina De Santis (born  21 December 1943) is an Italian former actress.

Life and career 
Born Carlotta Provin in  Vicenza, as a child De Santis won a beauty contest and at young age she started working for the advertising industry and on stage.  She made her film debut in 1954 in the melodrama Lacrime d'amore directed by Pino Mercanti, who suggested her stage name. She was very active in adventure films, Spaghetti Westerns, peplum and Eurospy films, sometimes credited as Dina De Saint. She retired from acting in the late 1960s.

Selected filmography 
 Tears of Love (1954)
 Vendicata! (1955)
 The Knight of the Black Sword (1956)
 Venice, the Moon and You (1958)
 Knight of 100 Faces (1960)
 Queen of the Seas (1961)
 The Secret of the Black Falcon (1961)
 The Black Duke (1963)
 Hercules and the Masked Rider (1963)
 Gentlemen of the Night (1964)
 Hercules Against Rome (1964)
 008: Operation Exterminate (1965)
 Giant of the Evil Island (1965)
 Tres dólares de plomo (1965)
 Super Seven Calling Cairo (1965)
 Last Man to Kill (1966)
 Assault on the State Treasure (1967)

References

External links  
 

1943 births
Living people 
People from Vicenza
Italian film actresses
Italian stage actresses
20th-century Italian actresses